The Izu robin (Larvivora tanensis) is a small passerine bird in the Old World flycatcher family Muscicapidae that is endemic to the Izu Islands of Japan.

The Izu robin was formerly treated as a subspecies of the Japanese robin (Larvivora akahige). It was split from the Japanese robin based mainly on the differences in vocalization.

References

External links

Izu robin
Birds of Japan
Izu robin